CGCG 049-033 is an elliptical galaxy, located some 680 million light-years from Earth, in the constellation of Serpens. It is the central galaxy (BCG) of the galaxy cluster Abell 2040.

CGCG 049-033 is known for having the longest galactic jet ever discovered. The beam is about 1.5 million light-years long and was discovered in December 2007.

References

Serpens (constellation)
Elliptical galaxies
Radio galaxies
054213
J15113138